Crofts is a surname of English origin. The name refers to:
Andrew Crofts (b. 1953), English writer
Andrew Crofts (b. 1984), Welsh professional football player
Daniel Webster Crofts (1828–1852), American lawyer and Mason; founder of the Phi Gamma Delta fraternity
Dash Crofts (b. 1940), American musician; half of the 1970s singing duo Seals and Crofts
Ernest Crofts (1847–1911), English painter
Freeman Wills Crofts (1879–1957), Irish-English mystery author
Hayley Crofts (b. 1988), New Zealand netball player
Lewis Crofts (b. 1977), English journalist and author
Marion Crofts (1966–1981), murder victim 
Stella Rebecca Crofts (1898–1964), English artist
Thomas Crofts (1722–1781), English Anglican priest, bibliophile, and Fellow of the Royal Society
William Carr Crofts (1846–1894), English lawyer and entrepreneur
William Crofts, 1st Baron Crofts (b. unknown, d. 1677), English nobleman

References

See also 
 Croft (disambiguation)
 Croft (surname)

Surnames of British Isles origin
English-language surnames
Occupational surnames
English-language occupational surnames